The Painesville City Local School District is a public school district based in Painesville, Ohio, United States.

Schools
Thomas W. Harvey High School
Heritage Middle School
Chestnut Elementary School
Elm Street Elementary School
Maple Elementary School
Red Raider Preschool

New buildings
From 2005 to 2010, The Painesville City Local School District is building five new school buildings to replace aging facilities.

 Chestnut Elementary School opened August 2007.
 Maple and Elm Street Elementary Schools and Heritage Middle School opened August 2008.
 Harvey High School opened Fall 2009.

See also
List of school districts in Ohio

References

External links
Painesville City Local School District – Official site.

School districts in Ohio
Education in Lake County, Ohio